Maciej Diłaj (born 3 August 1979) is a Polish former professional tennis player.

Hailing from a tennis playing family in Gdańsk, Diłaj's mother Wanda was a national champion in the 1980s. His twin brothers, Pawel and Piotr, were both world-ranked.

Diłaj, who played collegiate tennis for the University of Colorado, featured twice in the doubles main draw at the Idea Prokom Open in Sopot and won 13 ITF Futures titles.

ITF Futures titles

Singles: (1)

Doubles: (12)

References

External links
 
 

1979 births
Living people
Polish male tennis players
Colorado Buffaloes athletes
College men's tennis players in the United States
Sportspeople from Gdańsk